A war hawk is a person who actively supports a war.

War hawk, Warhawk or similar may also refer to:

Warhawk (1986 video game), a vertically scrolling video game, released by Firebird software
Warhawk (1995 video game), a Sony PlayStation game
Warhawk (2007 video game), a multiplayer-only PlayStation 3 remake of the PlayStation game
Curtiss P-40 Warhawk, an American World War II-era fighter aircraft
Warhawk (comics), a number of comic characters
The nickname of these U.S. military units:
195th Fighter Squadron, a unit of the Arizona Air National Guard stationed in Tucson, Arizona
314th Fighter Squadron, a training unit of the United States Air Force stationed in New Mexico
480th Fighter Squadron, a unit of the United States Air Force stationed in Germany
The nickname for athletic teams from:
Arrowhead High School
Auburn University at Montgomery – see Auburn Montgomery Warhawks
Calhoun Community College
Great Crossing High School in Georgetown, Kentucky
University of Louisiana at Monroe – see Louisiana–Monroe Warhawks
University of Wisconsin–Whitewater – see Wisconsin–Whitewater Warhawks
James Madison High School (California)
James Madison High School (Fairfax County, Virginia)
Marytown, Wisconsin
McMurry University
Mount Vernon–Enola High School
North Chicago Community High School
North Mahaska Community High School (New Sharon, Iowa)
Westerville Central High School